The territory of Cape Verde is divided into 22 concelhos (municipalities), and subdivided into 32 freguesias (equivalent to civil parish).

In Portuguese language usage, there are two words to distinguish the territory and the administrative organ. Administratively, right below the government, there are the municípios (municipalities), who administrate the concelhos. Therefore, the concelhos are the first-level administrative subdivision in Cape Verde. Each municipality has an Assembleia Municipal (municipal assembly, the legislative body) and a Câmara Municipal (municipal chamber, the executive body). Every four years elections are held for the Assembleia Municipal, the Câmara Municipal and the President of the Câmara Municipal. Where a municipality consists of several freguesias (civil parishes), a Delegação Municipal (municipal delegation) is established in the parishes that do not contain the municipal seat.

The islands are traditionally divided in two geographic regions (with no administrative meaning):

 Barlavento Islands (windward), the six northern islands and
 Sotavento Islands (leeward), the four southern ones.

Municipalities and civil parishes

Island group:  

The uninhabited island of Santa Luzia and all uninhabited islets, including Raso and Branco, are not part of any municipality, but are in the public domain of the state of Cape Verde.

See also
 ISO 3166-2:CV

References

External links
 Counties of Cape Verde at Statoids.com

 
Cape Verde
Cape Verde 1
Cape Verde geography-related lists
.
.